Therapie Taxi (sometimes stylized as Therapie TAXI) was a French musical group mixing many genres including pop, rock and hip-hop formed in 2016. They released two albums, two EPs, and a number of singles, most notably "Hit Sale". They announced their break-up in 2020.

Career
In December 2012, Adélaïde Chabannes posted an ad on EasyZic, a social media site for musicians seeking bandmates. Raphaël Faget-Zaoui responded and they collaborated establishing the band Milky Way. In 2016 they added Félix Gros (guitar and keyboards) and Renaud Bizart (drums) to the line-up and launched Therapie Taxi. Their debut single was "Salop(e)", released with Panenka Music.

In March 2017, they released their self-titled EP and promoted it at local gigs and festivals like Rock en Seine. Their collaboration with Roméo Elvis, single "Hit Sale", gave them their biggest known hit. The music video also proved very popular. The song was certified gold both in France and in French Belgian markets. It was the titular single from their album Hit Sale, released in 2018, accompanied by a tour and a prestigious appearance at la Maroquinerie, a famous venue in Paris. The album proved popular and a new edition of the album was launched on 16 November 2018 with additional eight tracks and two remixes by Yuksek and Contrefaçon.

In 2019, they engaged in a grand tour that also culminated in a concert at the Zenith in Paris and various appearances including at Solidays and Garorock. At the end of the tour, the departure of touring musicians Vincent Duteuil and Ilan Rabaté was announced. In 2019, they were nominated for the "Revelation Live" category during Victoires de la musique 2019.

Cadavre exquis was their 16-track second studio album, released on 6 December 2019. The tour associated with the release was cancelled because of the COVID-19 pandemic.

The group bid farewell with a 7-track EP Rupture 2 Merde, a single, "Été 90", and a music video.

Discography

Albums

EPs

Singles

*Did not appear in the official Belgian Ultratop 50 charts, but rather in the bubbling under Ultratip charts.

Other songs

*Did not appear in the official Belgian Ultratop 50 charts, but rather in the bubbling under Ultratip charts.

References

External links
Official website

2016 establishments in France
2021 disestablishments in France
Musical groups established in 2016
Musical groups disestablished in 2021
French rock music groups
French hip hop groups
French pop music groups